Frank Pentangeli is a fictional character from the 1974 film The Godfather Part II, portrayed by Michael V. Gazzo. Gazzo was nominated for a Best Supporting Actor Oscar for his performance, which he lost to Robert De Niro, his co-star from the same film (as young Vito Corleone). He is nicknamed "Frankie Five Angels" from his last name, which is formed from the Greek-derived prefix  (meaning "five") and the Italian word  ("angels").

Character overview
Born Francesco Pentangeli in Partinico, Sicily, Pentangeli has an older brother named Vincenzo who remained in Sicily when he immigrated to the United States. Frank is a caporegime in the Corleone family, running the family's operations in New York City while Michael Corleone (Al Pacino), his brother and underboss, Fredo (John Cazale), consigliere Tom Hagen and the other two capos, Rocco Lampone (Tom Rosqui) and Al Neri (Richard Bright), are based in Nevada. He was a top soldier in the regime of Peter Clemenza (Richard S. Castellano), and took over the regime after Clemenza's death.  He also moved into Vito's former estate in Long Beach, Long Island.  His bodyguard is longtime soldier Willi Cicci.

In The Godfather Part II, Frank Pentangeli is portrayed as having been one of godfather Vito Corleone's (Marlon Brando) most trusted associates. A rift grows between Pentangeli and Michael, however, that eventually results in Pentangeli betraying the family.

Pentangeli's character was created in The Godfather Part II by Coppola and Puzo due to actor Richard Castellano not reprising his role as Clemenza in the sequel. The Pentangeli character took the part in the plot which was originally intended for Clemenza, whose death was to be set anti-parallel to the extended sequence in which the young Vito becomes Clemenza's partner.

Coppola, in his director's commentary on The Godfather Part II, mentioned that the scenes depicting the Senate committee interrogation of Michael Corleone and Pentangeli are based on the Joseph Valachi federal hearings and that Pentangeli is like a Valachi figure.

In the film
Near the beginning of the story, Pentangeli approaches Michael to ask for his help in eliminating the Rosato brothers, rivals in New York, who claimed to have been promised territories by Clemenza prior to his death. Michael refuses, however, and orders Pentangeli to do nothing, as he does not want a war to interfere with an upcoming deal with Hyman Roth (Lee Strasberg), who supports the Rosatos. Pentangeli takes this as an insult and leaves in anger. Later that night, Michael narrowly escapes an assassination attempt at his home.

Michael concludes on his own that Roth was behind the assassination attempt.  After visiting Florida to seal the deal with Roth, Michael pays an unannounced visit to Pentangeli on Long Island and asks him to help take his revenge. As part of his plan, he insists that Pentangeli capitulate to the Rosato brothers so that Roth will not suspect that Michael is on to him. Pentangeli prefers open warfare against Roth and the Rosatos, but reluctantly obeys Michael's order.

Pentangeli arranges a meeting with the Rosato brothers. Arriving at the meeting place, Pentangeli leaves his bodyguard outside and enters the bar alone. Once inside, Tony Rosato (Danny Aiello) ambushes Pentangeli with a garotte, telling him, "Michael Corleone says hello." A policeman steps inside, and the attack degenerates into a shootout in the street. Pentangeli disappears and is believed to be dead.

Later, at a Senate hearing investigating organized crime and allegations of Michael's criminal activities, Michael learns that the committee intends to call Pentangeli as a surprise witness to contradict Michael's adamant denial that he is a crime boss. Both Pentangeli and Cicci have been in the protective custody of the FBI since the attempt upon his life. Believing that Michael ordered him murdered, Pentangeli provides a sworn statement to investigators that Michael is the head of the most powerful Mafia family in the nation, controls virtually all gambling activity in North America, and has ordered countless murders.

Most damningly, Pentangeli tells investigators that Michael personally killed Captain McCluskey and Virgil Sollozzo (portrayed by Sterling Hayden and Al Lettieri  respectively in The Godfather), and also began planning a mass slaughter of New York's other Mafia bosses as early as 1950. Cicci has also disclosed this to the FBI.  However, he is unable to directly implicate Michael in any criminal activities; due to "buffers" in the Corleone organization he never received orders directly from Michael. In contrast, since Pentangeli was a capo, there is no insulation between Michael and himself.  The Senate subcommittee and the FBI thus consider Pentangeli very credible, and are certain that he can corroborate Cicci's testimony and charge Michael with perjury.

While the committee is in recess, Michael and others look for a way to avoid the perjury charges. Fredo, who had unknowingly conspired with Michael's enemies, informs Michael that the hearing was engineered by Roth as part of his plan to eliminate him from the scene; plus, the committee's lawyer is on Roth's payroll.

Michael knows that Pentangeli's protective custody is too secure to make an attempt on his life before he testifies. Instead, Michael flies Pentangeli's brother, Vincenzo, in from Sicily, and Vincenzo accompanies Michael to the hearing at which Frank is scheduled to testify. Vincenzo and Frank exchange a silent glance before the hearing. Frightened, Frank recants his earlier statements, saying he "told the FBI guys what they wanted to hear," and now claims that the Corleone family is innocent of any wrongdoing, thus perjuring himself before the Senate committee. This testimony catches the committee completely off-guard and effectively derails the government's case against Michael.

After the hearing, Corleone family consigliere Tom Hagen (Robert Duvall) visits Pentangeli in custody. Hagen tells Pentangeli, a history buff, a story about how traitors in ancient Rome could spare their families if they committed suicide; the implication being that Michael will take care of Pentangeli's family if he kills himself. Pentangeli thanks Hagen, returns to his assigned quarters, and slits his wrists while taking a bath.

The finished film leaves unclear exactly what about his brother's presence motivated Pentangeli to change his story. The final film only states that Vincenzo is a powerful and ruthless Mafia chieftain in Sicily.

An early draft of the film's script explains that Vincenzo, shocked that his brother is about to betray the Corleones, attends the hearing to remind Frank that he must not break the Mafia's code of silence, . This is also spelled out in a cut scene in The Godfather II video game.  His brother's presence, as well as the stare they exchange, serves as a threat that if Frank follows through with his planned testimony, retribution will be taken against his children, who are living in Sicily under Vincenzo's guardianship.

In popular culture
This character made the national news on January 25, 2019, because he was referenced in the federal indictment of Roger Stone. Stone was arrested in Fort Lauderdale, Florida and charged with seven counts through an indictment in the Mueller investigation; one count of obstructing an official proceeding, five counts of false statements, and one count of witness tampering. "The indictment contains a reference to a character from 'The Godfather: Part II' who is intimidated into not testifying against a mafia boss. According to the indictment, Stone in late 2017 told an associate — identified as "Person 2" — that they should "do a 'Frank Pentangeli' before [the House Intelligence Committee] in order to avoid contradicting Stone's testimony.' The filing goes on to say, "Frank Pentangeli is a character in the film The Godfather: Part II, which both Stone and Person 2 had discussed, who testifies before a congressional committee and in that testimony claims not to know critical information that he does in fact know."

Stone's trial began on November 6, 2019. Randy Credico, a comedian and associate of Stone's testified that he refused to testify to Congress, "taking the Fifth", partly due to pressure from Stone. Stone's abusive texts to Credico were read out in court in which Stone called Credico a "maggot", a "rat", a "stoolie" and a "disloyal fuck", encouraging Credico to tell Mueller to "go fuck himself" and threatening to take the comedian's dog away (Credico relies on a medical support dog). On November 15, Stone was found guilty on all seven counts, obstruction of proceedings, five counts of false statements, and one count of witness tampering. Stone was ultimately pardoned by President Donald Trump.

References

The Godfather characters
Fictional capos
Fictional characters from New York City
Film characters introduced in 1974
Fictional suicides
Fictional Sicilian people
Fictional immigrants to the United States
Fictional Italian American people
Cultural depictions of the Mafia